Bonaventura Claverio (1606–1671) was a Roman Catholic prelate who served as Bishop of Potenza (1646–1671).

He was born in Vigevano, Italy and ordained a friar in the Order of Friars Minor Conventual. On 8 May 1646, he was selected as Bishop of Potenza and confirmed by Pope Urban VIII on 16 July 1646. On 22 July 1646, he was consecrated bishop by Marcello Lante della Rovere, Cardinal-Bishop of Ostia, with Alphonse Sacrati, Bishop Emeritus of Comacchio, and Ranuccio Scotti Douglas, Bishop of Borgo San Donnino, serving as co-consecrators. He served as Bishop of Potenza until his death in 1671.

References

External links and additional sources
 (for Chronology of Bishops) 
 (for Chronology of Bishops)  

17th-century Italian Roman Catholic bishops
1606 births
1671 deaths
Bishops appointed by Pope Urban VIII
Franciscan bishops